Charlotte Birch-Pfeiffer (23 June 1800 in Stuttgart25 August 1868 in Berlin) was a German actress, writer, director of the Stadttheater in Zürich for six years, and author of over 100 plays and libretto.

Biography
Charlotte Johanna Birch-Pfeiffer's father was a schoolmate of Schiller, supposedly her father was responsible for saving the manuscript Die Räuber by hiding it in his mattress. When he went blind in 1809, Birch-Pfeiffer read him the classics and by doing so gained a strong literary education. Both father and daughter loved the theater. In 1813 Birch-Pfeiffer's stage debut at the Munich Isarthortheater was supported by the Bavarian King, Max Joseph. From 1818 to 1826 she appeared in Prague, Stuttgart, Kassel, Hannover, Berlin, Dresden, and Hamburg as a member of the Munch Hoftheater playing the lead in tragic roles. In 1825 she married Danish writer and historian, Christian Andreas Birch, the couple begat two children. From 1827 to 1839 Charlotte acted at the Theater an der Wien. From 1837–1842 she worked as the director of the Stadttheater in Zürich. After professionally visiting most of the cities in Germany, in 1844 she accepted an engagement at the royal Berlin Hoftheater, to which she remained attached until her death. Her daughter, Wilhelmine von Hillern, also became an actress and writer.

Lasting influence
On 29 May 2012 Birch-Pfeiffer was honored as the first director of the Zürich theater, where an honorary board was placed for her. On 24 February 2013 at the Theater Stok in Zürich Charlotte Birch-Pfeiffer the play was performed about Birch-Pfeiffer's life.

Works

Publications
Charlotte Johanna Birch-Pfeiffer's publications as cited by An Encyclopedia of Continental Women Writers.
 Gesammelte Dramatische Werke, 23 Volumes (1863–1880), or the 74 plays collected in these volumes, only two have been translated to English. Twixt Axe & Crown [Elizabeth, Prinzessin von England] (1870) and Jane Eyre, or the Orphan of Lowood (1870)
 Gesammelte Novellen und Erzäwungen, 3 volumes (1863–1865)
 Charlotte von Birch-Pfeiffer und Heinrich Laube Im Briefwechsel (1917)
 Alexander von Weilen (1917)

Her plays
Dramatization of popular novels was her specialty, for which her intimate knowledge of the technical necessities of the stage fitted her. Her plays, adapted and original, fill 23 volumes (Gesammelte dramatische Werke; Leipzig, 1863–1880).
Many continued to retain the public favor. Her novels and tales were collected in three volumes (Gesammelte Novellen und Erzählungen; Leipzig, 1863–1865). Among her plays are:
 Dorf und Stadt (after Berthold Auerbach)
 Die Frau in Weiss (after Wilkie Collins)
 Der Glöckner von Notre Dame (after Victor Hugo)
 Der Goldbauer
 Die Grille (after George Sand)
 Die Günstlinge
 Der Herr Studiosus
 Hinko
 Kind des Glücks
 Steffen Langer aus Glogau oder Der holländische Kamin
 Der Leiermann und sein Pflegekind
 Mutter und Sohn
 Nacht und Morgen (after Edward Bulwer-Lytton)
 Pfefferrösel
 Die Waise aus Lowood (after Charlotte Brontë's Jane Eyre)

Notes

Attribution

External links

 
 A selection of works by Birch-Pfeiffer on the Sophie database

German women novelists
German women dramatists and playwrights
German stage actresses
1800 births
1868 deaths
19th-century German actresses
Actresses from Stuttgart
19th-century German women writers
19th-century German novelists
19th-century German dramatists and playwrights
Harold B. Lee Library-related rare books articles